The Green Party of Ontario is a political party in Ontario, Canada that ran a full slate of candidates in the 2011 Ontario provincial election. This was the second time the party ran a full slate of candidates, after 2007. The party received eight per cent of the popular vote in the 2007 election and three percent in the 2011 election.

References

2011
2011 Ontario general election